La Grande Chaloupe is a village on the island of Réunion, an overseas region of France in the Indian Ocean, located on its northern coast between Saint-Denis and La Possession. It lies within the Ravine de la Grande Chaloupe Important Bird Area.

References

Populated places in Réunion
Saint-Denis, Réunion